NGC 156 is a double star located in the Cetus constellation. It was discovered on 1882 by Ernst Wilhelm Leberecht Tempel.

See also 
 New General Catalogue
 List of NGC objects

References

Further reading

External links

NGC 156

NGC katalog 
 Interaktivni NGC Online Katalog
 Astronomska baza podataka SIMBAD
 NGC katalog na Messier45.com 
 NGC/IC projekt
 NGC2000 na NASA sajtu
 NGC na The Night Sky Atlas sajtu

Cetus (constellation)
0156
Double stars